Tõõdilaid (alternatively: Teedi saar, Teedilaid) is a small Estonian islet within Saastna Bay off the south-east coast of the island of Saaremaa in the Baltic Sea. The island covers 0.0136 hectares and has a perimeter of 0.6 kilometers and lies in an oblong Southwest-Northeast position. Tõõdilaid is administered by Saaremaa Parish, Saare County and is part of the Kahtla-Kübassaare hoiuala Limited-conservation area.

See also
 List of islands of Estonia

References

External links
EELIS Infoleht

Estonian islands in the Baltic
Saaremaa Parish